WKBD-TV (channel 50) is a television station in Detroit, Michigan, United States, affiliated with The CW. It is owned by the CBS News and Stations group alongside CBS owned-and-operated station WWJ-TV (channel 62). Both stations share studios on Eleven Mile Road in the Detroit suburb of Southfield, where WKBD-TV's transmitter is also located.

History

Channel 50 background
On the week before May 5, 1952, Goodwill Stations, owner of WJR radio in Detroit, announced the intent of applying for four station licenses which would operate as a regional network—UHF channel 50 in Detroit, VHF channel 11 in Toledo, Ohio, VHF channel 12 in Flint and VHF channel 5 in Bay City. In 1953, WBID-TV was granted a construction permit for Channel 62. Owned by Max Osnos' Woodward Broadcasting (Osnos also owned 9% of WITI in Milwaukee), WBID planned on broadcasting from the Cadillac Tower in downtown Detroit. The following year, the owners of WJLB radio were granted a permit for WJLB-TV on Channel 50; the station was never built, and WJLB-TV returned its allocation to the FCC by the end of 1954. Seeing an opportunity, WBID asked for and was granted Channel 50. But WBID never made it to the air—and neither did WTOH-TV (channel 79) in Toledo, Ohio, another proposed station owned by Woodward Broadcasting (both WBID and WTOH planned on taking at least some programming from the failing DuMont Television Network). It would be another decade before Detroiters would finally see programming on Channel 50.

WKBD-TV
WKBD first signed on the air on January 10, 1965, under the ownership of Kaiser Broadcasting, owned by industrialist Henry J. Kaiser. It started with an all-sports format, predating ESPN by some 14 years; WKBD began broadcasting at 5 p.m. on that date, with its first programs being two college basketball games (taped the day before): Michigan State University vs. the University of Iowa and the University of Detroit against the University of Dayton, followed by a live NHL game between the Detroit Red Wings and the Chicago Blackhawks. It eventually became a typical UHF independent station running cartoons, sitcoms and older movies. WKBD has been broadcasting in color since it first went on the air in 1965. Some locally produced programs such as The Lou Gordon Program were broadcast in black and white until the station upgraded to color studio cameras in the late 1960s. WKBD briefly gained a network affiliation in the spring of 1967, when it became the Detroit affiliate of the short-lived United Network. For many years, it aired an afternoon movie hosted by Detroit legend Bill Kennedy. WKBD also produced a hard-hitting weekly talk show, The Lou Gordon Program, which aired from the late 1960s until 1977 and was seen on all Kaiser stations (and a few non-Kaiser outlets). However, sports remained a central part of WKBD's schedule, and it was the over-the-air home for Red Wings hockey and Pistons basketball for 30+ years, as well as Tigers baseball for a decade. (In 1974, WKBD was the Detroit affiliate for TVS's coverage of the fledgling World Football League. However, they carried only one game of the local team, the Detroit Wheels: the season-opening loss to Memphis on July 10. The Wheels folded before the season ended and the WFL itself shut down midway through its second season a year later.)

In 1972, the Kaiser Broadcasting Corporation partnered with Field Communications in Kaiser Broadcasting Co. which included WKBD-TV, four other Kaiser stations and Field's single station in Chicago, WFLD. In 1977, the bulk of Kaiser Broadcasting Corporation, including WKBD, was sold to Field.

In 1982, Field put all its stations up for sale; however, the company had a difficult time selling WKBD-TV for the amount of money it wanted, despite its success. As a result, Field was forced to hold onto channel 50 for almost two years. In late 1983, Cox Enterprises offered to buy the station, which the company finally did on January 30, 1984. Shortly thereafter, the station dropped the -TV suffix from its call letters, becoming simply WKBD once again. At the same time, the station dropped the Field Communications font in its on-air branding and replaced it with a new, lined "50" it used until joining UPN.

The programming remained the same as before, with one notable exception: in the late 1980s, WKBD began airing Late Night with David Letterman when NBC affiliate WDIV (channel 4) declined to clear it; this mirrored a similar situation in the mid-1970s, when WDIV (then known as WWJ-TV) declined to air Saturday Night Live—the first two seasons of the show originally aired in the Detroit market on WKBD. Coincidentally, one of the show's original cast members, Gilda Radner, was born in Detroit.

The Ghoul Show aired in Detroit on WKBD from 1971 to 1975; the show featured late-night horror movie host Ron Sweed in the title role and was produced by WKBD's Kaiser-owned Cleveland, Ohio sister station at the time, WKBF-TV. When Kaiser dropped the program, the show's production moved to Detroit where it was produced by and aired on WXON (channel 20, now WMYD). The show moved briefly to WGPR (channel 62, now WWJ-TV) and then back to WXON. Although never produced at WKBD itself, the program was very popular and was one of the few local programs that aired on WKBD that was not related to sports.

As a Fox affiliate
On October 9, 1986, channel 50, along with Cox's other two independent stations (KTVU in Oakland, California and KDNL-TV in St. Louis, Missouri) became a charter affiliate of the Fox network, yet it was not until 1990 that the station began identifying as "WKBD 50/Fox Detroit", which was soon dropped in favor of adopting "Fox 50" as its on-air branding. However, for much of its tenure with Fox, WKBD was still programmed essentially as a de facto independent station, as the network did not run a full week's worth of programming until 1993. Owing to its large cable footprint, the station served as the default Fox affiliate for the Traverse City/Cadillac/Sault Ste. Marie and Marquette markets as well (both markets are now served by Fox through in-market affiliates WFQX-TV and WLUC-DT2).

Under Cox ownership, a new, larger facility was constructed for channel 50's use in the late 1980s, directly next to their original facility in Southfield, with two production studios and a newsroom for the station's newscast (with the original facility continuing use for the station's transmitter and as storage; said building had been constructed with the intention of it being only a temporary facility by Kaiser); the station officially opened the facility on May 24, 1988.

Channel 50 was later sold to the Paramount Stations Group in June 1993. Even though WKBD was one of Fox's strongest affiliates, Fox announced that it would move its Detroit affiliation to WJBK-TV (channel 2), Detroit's longtime CBS affiliate, by the end of 1994. This was a result of WJBK's then-owner, New World Communications, striking a group deal with Fox to switch the network affiliations of twelve of the company's stations to Fox (which then bought ten of the New World stations affected by the deal in 1996; New World had earlier sold two other stations it could not keep due to ownership conflicts to Fox outright). CBS then approached WKBD for an affiliation after being turned down by WXYZ-TV (channel 7, which opted to renew its affiliation with ABC via an agreement where three other stations became affiliates of that network) and WDIV (which had a long-term contract with NBC at the time), since it was the only non-Big Three station in Detroit that had a functioning news department. However, Viacom, which had just bought Paramount, turned the offer down because it was about to switch all of its non-Big Three stations to the upstart United Paramount Network (UPN), of which it co-founded with United Television (United owned and operated the network, Paramount produced its programming.)

As a UPN affiliate
WJBK became Detroit's Fox affiliate on December 11, 1994. As a result, WKBD briefly went independent again until UPN began operations on January 16, 1995. Channel 50's programming was unchanged from its days as a Fox affiliate, except for the prime time programming provided by UPN. Eventually, the older sitcoms were replaced with more first-run syndicated talk or reality shows. Fox Kids stayed on WKBD until 1998, when it moved to WADL (channel 38); WJBK, like most of the New World stations that affiliated with Fox, declined to carry the block. WKBD continued to carry morning/afternoon cartoon blocks supplied by UPN (first with UPN Kids, and then Disney's One Too) until the network stopped running children's programs in August 2003. WKBD became a UPN O&O when Viacom purchased a 50% interest in the network in 1996; in effect, becoming the second network O&O in Detroit (and the third overall, factoring WXYZ-TV, which ABC had owned from 1948 until the station's sale to the E. W. Scripps Company in 1986), predating the completion of WJBK's sale to Fox in 1997.

In 2000, Viacom acquired CBS, a move that united channel 50 with WWJ-TV (channel 62), which CBS acquired in 1995 after losing its affiliation with WJBK. After the merger, WWJ-TV moved from its facilities in downtown Detroit to WKBD's Southfield studios. At first, only the financial and technical staffs were combined, with WKBD general manager Mike Dunlop becoming manager of both stations; Dunlop left in August 2002. WKBD is the senior partner since it is the longer-established of the two stations, unlike the other duopolies involving CBS and UPN (and later CBS and CW) stations, where the CBS station is the senior partner.

As a CW affiliate
On January 24, 2006, CBS Corporation (which WKBD and WWJ-TV became part of as a result of the December 2005 split of the original Viacom, which became CBS Corporation, from CBS) and the Warner Bros. Television unit of Time Warner announced that the two companies would shut down UPN and The WB and combine the networks' respective programming to create a new network called The CW. That day, the new network signed a 10-year affiliation deal with 11 UPN stations owned by CBS, including WKBD. However, it is likely that WKBD would have been chosen over WB affiliate WDWB (now WMYD, which affiliated with MyNetworkTV, another upstart network that debuted two weeks before The CW's launch) in any event, as it was the higher-rated station.

Programming

Sports programming
WKBD produced and broadcast Detroit Red Wings hockey telecasts from 1965 to 2003, with a two-year hiatus in the 1980s, when the team's games were carried on WXON (now WMYD) through the subscription television service ON-TV. Detroit Tigers baseball games were broadcast on the station from 1994 to 2005 (with WJBK occasionally airing Tigers games from 2004 to 2007), while Detroit Pistons basketball games were broadcast from 1972 to May 2004 (when rights moved to WMYD, which carried the Pistons telecasts until 2008); all three teams are now exclusively on Bally Sports Detroit.

The short-lived World Football League, through the TVS network, aired games on WKBD in its only full season in 1974; the first telecast, on July 10, featured the hometown Detroit Wheels against the Memphis Southmen. (The station also planned to carry the September 25 game at New York, but backed off as both teams were about to fold by that point.) Later, Detroit Lions preseason football was broadcast on channel 50 from 1992 to 1996 and again from 2004 to 2008.

The station also produced occasional pre-game and post-game shows for all four professional teams. WKBD aired special coverage of the Red Wings' Stanley Cup celebration and parade ceremonies in 1997 and 1998, as well as carrying the final Tigers game played at Tiger Stadium on September 27, 1999. During the final year of its Fox affiliation, WKBD was the primary station for the Lions for much of the 1994 season (the team's last game on WKBD was the December 10 game at the New York Jets, with the games moving back to WJBK the next week). On occasion (and regularly during preseason games), WKBD produced broadcasts of Detroit Lions football games, as well as Detroit Pistons basketball games, until the late 1980s when the Pistons decided to produce and distribute the games itself, with WKBD responsible for advertising. Both teams' games were simulcast on a handful of other stations across Michigan.

On April 16, 2008, CBS O&O sister station WWJ-TV entered into an agreement to carry Detroit Lions exhibition games. The departure of longtime sports producer Toby Cunningham (whose termination was part of budget cuts imposed by CBS Corporation at all of its television stations) closed the book on the storied history of sports coverage by WKBD. WWJ-TV broadcast preseason Lions games until 2010, when WXYZ-TV was signed as the team's new flagship station.

News operations
Under Kaiser Broadcasting ownership, in 1968, WKBD began producing a nightly newscast at 10 p.m.; this was part of a large investment by Kaiser into forming news departments for most of their stations. Ultimately, the entire news operation was closed after only two years, due to a weak economy and reluctance to embrace UHF stations; WKBD's news operation was the only one of Kaiser's news departments to turn a profit, though ratings were still much lower than expected.

During Field Communications' tenure as owner, WKBD only aired brief newscasts at various times of the day, typically called Newscene (or alternately News Scene), similar to that of other Field-owned stations at the time, such as its Chicago outlet WFLD. It was not until 1985 that the station, now under Cox ownership, opted to try again at a 10 p.m. news. The new newscast launched in the summer of that year, with news/public affairs director Amyre Makupson—previously the anchor of the Newscene updates under Field, as well as the producer and co-host of the local talk show Morning Break—appointed lead anchor alongside Glenn Ray (previously of WILX-TV in Lansing), weathercaster Randy Bhirdo (also of WILX) and former WJBK sportscaster Ray Lane.

Originally a half-hour program, The Ten O'Clock News expanded to a full hour in 1989. The program received competition in December 1994 when WJBK launched its own hour-long prime time newscast at 10 p.m. after that station took the Fox affiliation from channel 50; indeed, the first week after the switch saw channel 50's prime time ratings virtually collapse without Fox programming (as UPN would not launch for another month), resulting in WKBD's newscast falling to fifth place in the timeslot, a problem exacerbated by frequent preemptions and delays from the local sporting events WKBD held the rights to. In 2001, WKBD began producing an 11 p.m. newscast for WWJ-TV. (Discussions of WKBD's news department producing news for WWJ had been underway prior to the CBS-Viacom merger of 1999; at least one dress rehearsal of a channel 62 newscast had been conducted before the merger.)

WKBD tried to brand its own newscast as a younger, more unconventional program and WWJ-TV's as a more traditional Big Three O&O-style newscast (resulting in Makupson and her co-anchor at this point, Rich Fisher, being assigned solely to WWJ's newscast, to allow for WKBD's newscast to target a younger demographic). However, the two stations used the same anchors, reporters and equipment; this resulted in one newspaper critic, Tom Long of The Detroit News, decrying both newscasts as being the "attack of the clones".

After going through several name changes to coincide with the changes in ownership and network affiliations over the years and enduring continued low ratings (as well as being the last news operation inherited from Paramount that Viacom was still operating), the station's news department was shut down in December 2002 (WKBD's newscasts were called UPN Detroit Nightside by this time) after having existed in one form or another for 34 years (rumors had surfaced in September of that year). The newscast that the station produced for WWJ-TV was canceled as a result of the discontinuance of channel 50's in-house 10 p.m. program, the byproduct of that being that WWJ-TV became the only owned-and-operated station of one of the four major networks (CBS, NBC, ABC or Fox) without any news programming. ABC affiliate WXYZ-TV then entered into a news share agreement with WKBD to continue producing a 10 p.m. newscast for the station that would be produced at WXYZ's Southfield studios and would feature some of WKBD's former news staff, but many longtime Channel 50 employees simply lost their jobs; the WXYZ-produced 10 p.m. broadcast was canceled in 2005.  As a result, WKBD no longer broadcast news programming at 10 p.m., with the time slot being filled by off-network syndicated shows, such as repeats of sitcoms like The Big Bang Theory and Modern Family, for the next 15 years.

No news programming aired on the station until February 7, 2011, when a two-hour extension of sister station WWJ-TV's weekday morning newscast First Forecast Mornings premiered in the 7–9 a.m. timeslot. The live program showcases weather, traffic and news headlines. The extension competed against the national morning newscasts aired by WWJ-TV, WXYZ and WDIV, and WJBK's highly rated morning newscast. WKBD-TV, along with WWJ-TV, began broadcasting all locally produced programming in high definition on February 2, 2012, making them the final CBS-owned properties with an in-house news operation to upgrade to HD. First Forecast Mornings was canceled on December 28, 2012 due to low viewership. The stations continued to air syndicated programming in place of traditional evening and late-night newscasts for several years after. In September 2013, WKBD began airing an extension of WWJ-TV's weather forecast segment First Forecast each weeknight at 10:58 p.m. (two minutes before the segment's late evening broadcast on WWJ-TV).

On January 22, 2020, the station launched a new 10 p.m. newscast, which is produced in conjunction with the CBSN Local streaming operations, and was introduced as part of an expansion of news programming on CBS's CW-affiliated and independent stations. The newscasts are produced from Dallas–Fort Worth sister station KTVT, and feature contributions from multimedia journalists based in Detroit. In July 2022, the newscast was relaunched as Detroit Now News; it remains hubbed from KTVT, but now uses a mix of local stories (reported by staff hired for the new CBS News Detroit operation at WWJ) interspersed with national segments shared with other local versions of the program.

Notable former on-air staff
 Syma Chowdhry – First Forecast Mornings news anchor
 Ray Lane – sports anchor
 Byron MacGregor – anchor
 Amyre Makupson – anchor

Technical information

Subchannels
The station's digital signal is multiplexed:

On July 11, 2018, WKBD-TV added two new subchannels from Sinclair Broadcast Group: Comet and Charge!, followed on December 22 of that year, by TBD.

Analog-to-digital conversion 
WKBD-TV was granted a license for a digital transmitter facility in January 2001. The station shut down its analog signal, over UHF channel 50, on June 12, 2009, the official date in which full-power television stations in the United States transitioned from analog to digital broadcasts under federal mandate. The station's digital signal continued to broadcast on its pre-transition UHF channel 14. Through the use of PSIP, digital television receivers display the station's virtual channel as its former UHF analog channel 50. On July 24, 2012, WPXD began using the channel 50 allocation for its digital signal, broadcasting from Southfield.

Out-of-market cable coverage
WKBD is available on many cable systems in Southeast Michigan, Southwestern Ontario and Northwest Ohio. Outside of the Detroit area, however, most programming on WKBD is subject to territorial syndication exclusivity restrictions placed on cable providers by the local broadcast rights holders to certain syndicated programs. During the affected programming, cable systems either switch to a feed from another channel, or run an on-screen text notice acknowledging the blacked out programming (such as "This channel is being blacked out due to FCC regulations"). In Canada, some programs may be subject to simultaneous substitution.

In 1994, when Fox moved its Detroit affiliation from WKBD to WJBK, many Michigan cable systems outside the Detroit area replaced WKBD with the network's Cadillac affiliate WGKI (now WFQX-TV), in order to keep Fox programming available in the Upper Peninsula. However, in areas where Fox was already available locally, mainly in television markets located in southern and central Michigan (especially the Tri-Cities), much of WGKI's programming was blacked out. In 1996, some systems that dropped WKBD for WGKI brought the former back.

Following the launch of The CW, WKBD began to be dropped from cable providers outside of the Detroit market, in favor of local or nearby CW or MyNetworkTV affiliates, and at present is not carried any farther away than Flint and Hillsdale.

See also

Media in Detroit

References

External links

TV Ark Database: WKBD-50 UPN Detroit – Archive from Internet Archive Wayback Machine
The Lou Gordon Program

The CW affiliates
Comet (TV network) affiliates
Charge! (TV network) affiliates
TBD (TV network) affiliates
KBD-TV
Kaiser Broadcasting
Field Communications
CBS News and Stations
Television channels and stations established in 1965
1965 establishments in Michigan
Superstations in the United States
Companies based in Southfield, Michigan
National Hockey League over-the-air television broadcasters